{{DISPLAYTITLE:C18H12O8}}
The molecular formula C18H12O8 (molar mass: 356.28 g/mol, exact mass: 356.0532 u) may refer to:

 Isoxerocomic acid
 Xerocomic acid

Molecular formulas